Isabelle Pearson (born March 14, 1981) is a female judoka from Canada, who won the bronze medal in the women's half middleweight division (+ 63 kg) at the 2003 Pan American Games in Santo Domingo, Dominican Republic, alongside Argentina's Daniela Krukower.

See also
Judo in Canada

References
 

1981 births
Living people
Canadian female judoka
Judoka at the 2003 Pan American Games
Pan American Games bronze medalists for Canada
Pan American Games medalists in judo
Medalists at the 2003 Pan American Games
20th-century Canadian women
21st-century Canadian women